Cidade Nova ("New City") is a neighborhood of the northeast region of Belo Horizonte.  Currently, Cidade Nova's neighborhood that shelters the most public inhabitants of Belo Horizonte. This includes footballers, singers (Cézar Menotti & Fabiano and others), swimmers, TV reporters, etc... It is also considered a noble neighborhood in Belo Horizonte.

Pleasure, sports, and education

Schools: Colégio Espanhol Santa Maria, Acalanto, NUPI, Escola Municipal Professora Maria Modesta Cravo, Escola Municipal Anísio Teixeira
 Parque Ecológico e Cultural da Cidade Nova (Cultural and Ecologic Park of New City)

Main roads
Access Roads: Avenida Cristiano Machado (Cristiano Machado Avenue), Av. José Candido da Silveira

Neighbourhoods in Belo Horizonte